Sükhbaatar is a sum (district) of Sükhbaatar Province in eastern Mongolia. The Tömörtiin Ovoo Zinc Mine is 40 km west of the sum center. In 2009, its population was 3,197.

The Sükhbaatar Province capital of Baruun-Urt is a small (50 km2) enclave at the southwest part of Sükhbaatar sum, 50 km from the sum center.

References 

Districts of Sükhbaatar Province